Laurence Engel (born on 17 September 1966) is a French essayist and senior civil servant.

In 2016, she was appointed president of the Bibliothèque nationale de France.

References

1966 births
Living people
Writers from Paris
French civil servants
French librarians
French women writers
French women librarians